A promontory is a prominent mass of land which overlooks lower lying land or a body of water.

Promontory may also refer to:

Geology and geography 
Promontory Summit, where the United States first transcontinental railroad was completed in Box Elder County, Utah
Promontory, Utah, an unincorporated community on Promontory Summit
Promontory Mountains, a mountain range in Box Elder County, Utah, United States

Anatomy 
Sacral promontory, in anatomy, the anteriormost portion of the sacrum
Promontory of tympanic cavity, a part of the ear

Other 
"Promontory", a 1992 song from The Last of the Mohicans soundtrack
Promontory Financial Group, a wholly owned subsidiary of IBM

See also
 Promontory Point (disambiguation)